Kemp's thicket rat (Thamnomys kempi) is a species of rodent in the family Muridae.
It is found in Burundi, Democratic Republic of the Congo, and Rwanda.
Its natural habitat is subtropical or tropical moist montane forests.
It is threatened by habitat loss.

References

Sources

Thamnomys
Rodents of Africa
Mammals of Burundi
Mammals of Rwanda
Mammals of the Democratic Republic of the Congo
Vulnerable animals
Vulnerable biota of Africa
Mammals described in 1911
Taxonomy articles created by Polbot